Canal du Centre may mean:
Canal du Centre (Belgium)
Canal du Centre (France)